The 2017–18 season is Queens Park Rangers' third consecutive season in the Championship following their relegation from the Premier League in the 2014–15 season. Along with the Championship, the club will participate in the FA Cup and the EFL Cup.

The season covers the period from 1 July 2017 to 30 June 2018.

Players

First team squad

Kit
Supplier: Erreà / Sponsor: Royal Panda

Kit information
QPR agreed a multi-year partnership with Erreà to replace Dryworld as the official technical kit suppliers from the 2017/18 season. The kits will be 100 per-cent bespoke designs for the duration of the deal. The Kits were revealed on 23 June.

On 22 June QPR announced a three-year shirt sponsorship deal with online casino Royal Panda.

New contracts

Transfers

Transfers in

Transfers out

Loans out

Friendlies
For the 2017/18 season, QPR announced pre-season friendlies against Peterborough United, FC Union Berlin, Lokomotive Leipzig, Bournemouth as well as behind-closed-doors games against Bromley, and Reading.

Competitions

Overview

Goals

Clean sheets

Disciplinary record

Notes

References

Notes

Queens Park Rangers F.C. seasons
Queens Park Rangers